Altina was an ancient settlement or fortress in Scythia Minor. The site is now the modern village of Oltina.

Iranian archaeological sites
Indo-European archaeological sites
Scythia